Braggin' in Brass: The Immortal 1938 Year is a compilation album of American pianist, composer and bandleader Duke Ellington's 1938 recordings for the Brunswick label which was released in 1991.

Reception
The Allmusic review by Stephen Cook awarded the album 4 stars stating "this 1938 incarnation of Ellington's group held their own with many fine compositions, a seamless sense of swing, and a wealth of unique solo contributions, elements that set the group apart throughout the big-band era. Maybe not as essential as other Ellington titles, but still highly recommended".

Track listing
All compositions by Duke Ellington except where noted
 "Please Forgive Me" (Ellington, Irving Gordon, Irving Mills) - 2:59  
 "Lambeth Walk" (Douglas Furber, Noel Gay) - 2:27  
 "Prelude to a Kiss" (Ellington, Gordon, Mills) - 2:56  
 "Hip Chic" - 2:55  
 "Buffet Flat" - 2:24  
 "Mighty Like the Blues" (Leonard Feather) - 2:34  
 "Jazz Potpourri" - 2:55  
 "T.T. on Toast" (Ellington, Mills) - 2:45  
 "Battle of Swing" - 2:56  
 "Blue Light" - 2:36  
 "Blue Light" [alternate take] - 2:40  
 "Boy Meets Horn" (Ellington, Rex Stewart) - 2:59  
 "Slap Happy" - 2:44  
Recorded at ARC-Brunswick Studios in New York on August 4, 1938 (track 1), August 9, 1938 (tracks 2-5), September 2, 1938 (track 6), December 19, 1938 (tracks 7-9), and December 22, 1938 (tracks 10-13).

Personnel
Duke Ellington – piano
Rex Stewart - cornet
Wallace Jones, Cootie Williams - trumpet
Lawrence Brown, Joe Nanton - trombone
Juan Tizol - valve trombone
Barney Bigard - tenor saxophone, clarinet
Johnny Hodges - alto saxophone, soprano saxophone 
Otto Hardwick - clarinet, alto saxophone
Harry Carney - baritone saxophone, clarinet, alto saxophone
Fred Guy - guitar
Billy Taylor - bass 
Sonny Greer - drums

References

Duke Ellington albums
1991 compilation albums
Portrait Records compilation albums